The 1944 Central Michigan Chippewas football team represented Central Michigan College of Education, later renamed Central Michigan University, as an independent during the 1944 college football season.  In their eighth season under head coach Ron Finch, the Chippewas compiled a 5–2 record and outscored all opponents by a combined total of 150 to 106. The team's two losses were to Bowling Green and Western Michigan.

Schedule

References

Central Michigan
Central Michigan Chippewas football seasons
Central Michigan Chippewas football